Meridian High School is a four-year public secondary school within the West Ada School District located in Meridian, Idaho, comprising grades 9–12.

History 

The school began classes in the year of 1904 at the corners of Pine Street and Meridian Road, in a one-room schoolhouse. Meridian High was the first high school in the Meridian area. During most of the twentieth century, Meridian and surrounding areas were separated from  Boise to the east by a significant amount of agricultural land, which later became developed.

In 1975, a larger, more modern campus (initially containing four buildings) was built at the present location, at the intersection of Pine Ave. and Linder Rd. With enrollment already exceeding capacity when the new campus opened, an addition to the classroom building was completed the following year. Growth continued into the mid-1980s, forcing the school to adopt a split-shift schedule to accommodate the 2,400 students attending a facility built for 1,800.

Until 1987, it was the only high school in the Meridian School District, and had the largest enrollment in the state.  With rapid growth in the Meridian and west Boise area, four additional high schools opened in the next two decades to relieve congestion.

In the fall of 2007, a new PTC building was constructed, housing three new shops and adding additional space for students and faculty. Additional space for the Future Farmers of America (FFA) was also established.

Athletics 
The Warriors have won over 60 district and 39 state championships. The most recent additions were the 5A state wrestling (spring 2022) and state and national dance championships.
Fall sports: soccer, football, cross country, volleyball, golf 
Winter sports: wrestling, basketball, ice hockey
Spring sports: baseball, softball, tennis, track, and Lacrosse
Year-round sports and activities: swimming, cheer, dance, competitive speech and debate

State titles
Boys
 Football (3): fall 1986, 2005, 2007 (official with introduction of playoffs, fall 1979)•
(unofficial poll titles - 0)  (poll introduced in 1963, through 1978)
 Cross Country (3): fall 1986, 1998, 2001  (introduced in 1964)
 Basketball (4): 1979, 1983, 1992, 2021 
 Wrestling (5): 1983, 1985, 1986, 1987, 2022  (introduced in 1958)
 Baseball (2): 1985, 1987 (records not kept by IHSAA, state tourney introduced in 1971)
 Track (2): 1986, 1987 
 Golf (4): 1983, 2001, 2002, 2003  (introduced in 1956)
 Soccer (2): 1995, 2002 
 Ice Hockey (2): 2000,2001
Girls
 Cross Country (4): fall 1999, 2000, 2001, 2002  (introduced in 1974)
 Volleyball (1) fall 1981  (introduced in 1976)
 Basketball (4): 1980, 1981, 1982, 1983  (introduced in 1976)
 Track (1): 1986  (introduced in 1971)

Combined
 Tennis (3): 1963, 1964, 1983  (introduced in 1963, combined team until 2008)

School newspaper 
The Meridian High Newspaper, the Warwhoop, has history dating back to the 1940s.  The current layout design program used is Adobe InDesign CS3. The Warwhoop's historic papers are located in Meridian High School in the current newspaper room.

Yearbook 
The school's yearbook is called the Mana Ha Sa which is said to be how MHS is pronounced by some unspecified Native Americans. The current layout design program used is Adobe InDesign CS3.

Bands 
The band program consists of: Warrior Marching Band, Warrior Pep Band, Symphonic Band, Varsity Jazz Band, Percussion Ensemble, Jazz Combo and Concert Band.

Notable alumni
Gracie Pfost (attended, '24) - state's first woman in Congress (1953–63)
Vern Law ('48) - MLB pitcher, 162 wins
Ron Packard ('49) - congressman from southern California (1983–2001)
William Agee ('56) - business executive
Russ Fulcher ('80) - congressman from Idaho's first district (2019–present)
James Smith ('91) - commander of Peterson-Schriever Garrison of U.S. Space Force
Max Butler - former security consultant and online hacker arrested for theft
Kyle Brotzman - Boise State placekicker (2007–10)

References

External links

Public high schools in Idaho
Educational institutions established in 1904
Schools in Ada County, Idaho
Meridian, Idaho
1904 establishments in Idaho
West Ada School District (Idaho)